RMLL may stand for:
 Rocky Mountain Lacrosse League
 Rencontres Mondiales du Logiciel Libre, the French name of the Libre Software Meeting

fr:RMLL